Dampa Tiger Reserve or Dampha Tiger Reserve is a tiger reserve of western Mizoram, India. It was declared a tiger reserve in 1994 and is part of Project Tiger.

The tropical forests of Dampa Tiger Reserve are home to a diverse flora and fauna. It consists of forest interpolated with steep precipitous hills, deep valleys, jungle streams, ripping rivulets, natural salts licks. Dampa Tiger Reserve is not easily accessible unlike other park where you can ride on a four wheeler but one has to walk through the forest if one wishes to sight animals.

In the tiger census of 2018, no tiger was found in this reserve. A tiger was spotted recently after seven years.

Etymology
The word Dampa means "lonely men" and refers to a local narrative about a village, where a lot of the women died.

History

Jurisdiction is under two ranges, namely Teirei Range and Phuldungsei Range. Workers consist of a field director who is headquartered in W. Phaileng. There are also about five foresters and 10 regular forest guards.

Flora
Rare floral species have been found in Dampa Tiger Reserve including rare ginger species Globba spathulata and Hemiorchis pantlingii.

Fauna

Mammals 
Dampa Tiger Reserve hosts Indian leopard, sloth bear, gaur, serow, barking deer, wild boar, hoolock gibbon, Phayre's leaf monkey, gray langur, Rhesus macaque and slow loris. Four Bengal tigers were recorded in 1994 but none were recorded in 2019. Dampa Tiger Reserve has one of the highest clouded leopard populations in South and South East Asia.

In 2012, tiger presence was confirmed through Scat samples. No tiger was recorded in Dampa Tiger Reserve in the years 2018–2019. However, the National Tiger Conservation Authority recommended that tigers from Assam’s Kaziranga National Park be introduced to Dampa Tiger Reserve.

Birds 
Bird species sighted in Dampa Tiger Reserve include great hornbill, wreathed hornbill, oriental pied hornbill, scarlet-backed flowerpecker, Kalij pheasant, grey peacock-pheasant, speckled piculet and white-browed piculet, bay woodpecker, greater yellownape, greater flameback, great barbet, blue-throated barbet, red-headed trogon, Indian cuckoo, Asian barred owlet, green imperial pigeon, mountain imperial pigeon, emerald dove, crested serpent eagle, Malayan night heron, long-tailed broadbill, Asian fairy bluebird, blue-winged leafbird, golden-fronted leafbird, orange-bellied leafbird, scarlet minivet, maroon oriole, greater racket-tailed drongo, Indian paradise-flycatcher, pale-chinned blue flycatcher, blue-throated flycatcher, black-naped monarch, grey-headed canary flycatcher, white-rumped shama, slaty-backed forktail, spotted forktail, chestnut-bellied nuthatch, velvet-fronted nuthatch, black bulbul, black-crested bulbul, ashy bulbul, white-throated bulbul, slaty-bellied tesia and striated yuhina.

Threat
It has been reported that there has been an increase in built up (590%), bamboo forest (192.89%) and scrub (74.67%) areas. These increases are simultaneously accompanied by decrease in cover area of evergreen/semi evergreen closed forests from 152.47 km2 in 1978 to 95.27 km2 in 2005. This could be due to the practice of shifting cultivation by villagers at the border of the reserve. A 62-km fence and patrol road along the Bangladesh boundary near the reserve in Mizoram is hindering the free movement of Tigers at Dampa. Oil palm and Teak plantations which occupy areas close to the Dampa Tiger Reserve are also reducing habitat of birds and animals and could pose a bigger threat to wildlife than shifting cultivation. There have also been reported cases of poaching by different groups including local hunters and insurgent groups like Shanti Bahini and the National Liberation Front of Tripura.

See also
 List of Protected areas in India
 Protected areas of India
 National parks of India
 Tourism in Mizoram
 Reserved forests and protected forests of India

References

External Links 
 Report of Dampa
Through Zakhuma’s Lens - Dampa Tiger Reserve by Green Hub on YouTube
 

Tiger reserves of India
Protected areas of Mizoram
1985 establishments in Mizoram
Protected areas established in 1985